Leksdalvatnet is a lake in Trøndelag county, Norway that lies in the municipalities of Steinkjer and Verdal. It is drained by Figgja.

The villages of Forbregd and Lein lie at the southern end of the lake, Leksdalen is on the eastern side of the lake, and Sem (in Steinkjer) lies at the northern end.

See also
List of lakes in Norway

References

Verdal
Steinkjer
Lakes of Trøndelag